Harry Vere White (1853–1941) was an Irish Anglican bishop in the 20th century.

He was educated at Trinity College, Dublin (whence he gained a Dublin Master of Arts (MA Dubl) and ordained in 1879. He was a curate at Ardbraccan and then went to New Zealand until 1885. He was Rector of Almoritia and Killesk and then Secretary of the SPG until 1905. He was Vicar of St Bartholomew's Dublin and later Archdeacon of Dublin. From 1918 to 1921 he was Dean of Christ Church Cathedral, Dublin when he was ordained to the episcopate as Bishop of Limerick, Ardfert and Aghadoe. He retired in 1933.

References

External links
 

1853 births
1941 deaths
Alumni of Trinity College Dublin
Archdeacons of Dublin
Deans of Christ Church Cathedral, Dublin
20th-century Anglican bishops in Ireland
Bishops of Limerick, Ardfert and Aghadoe